Events from the year 1611 in Denmark.

Incumbents 
 Monarch – Christian IV
 Steward of the Realm –

Events 

 April  The Kalmar War begins as Denmark-Norway declares war upon Sweden.
 3 May –  Danish forces lay siege to Kalmar. The Siege of Kalmar ends on August 3.
 26 June  The Swedish Storming of Kristianopel.
 3 July  Battle of Risbye.

Undated
 A Statue of Leda and the Swan is mounted on a tall column an installed on an artificial islet in the Port of Copenhagen.

Births 
 2 February  Ulrik of Denmark, Prince of Denmark (died 1633)
 3 February  Christian Ulrik Gyldenløve,  military officer (died (died 1640)

Undated
 12 November  Joachim Gersdorff, statesman (died 1650)

Deaths

Publications
Caspar Bartholin the Elder, Anatomicae Institutiones Corporis Humani (1611)

References

External links

 
Denmark
Years of the 17th century in Denmark